Schrijver means "writer" in Dutch. As a surname, it may refer to various people. See:

Schrijver
 Alexander Schrijver (b. 1948), Dutch mathematician and computer scientist
 Isaq Schrijver (c. 1650 – c. 1706), Dutch explorer in South Africa
 Loretta Schrijver (b. 1956), Dutch television host
 Peter Schrijver (1576–1660), Dutch writer and scholar better known as "Petrus Scriverius"
 Peter Schrijver (b. 1963), Dutch linguist and Celtologist

Skriver
 Ina Skriver (b. 1949), Danish actress and model
 Josephine Skriver (b. 1993), Danish model

Schrijvers
 :de:Petrus Hermanus Schrijvers (b. 1939), Dutch classical philologist (predominantly Latinist), also known as Piet Schrijvers
 Piet Schrijvers (b. 1946), Dutch football goalkeeper and manager
 Siebe Schrijvers (b. 1996), Belgian footballer

De Schrijver
 :de:Karel De Schrijver (1908–1992), Belgian composer, conductor and violinist 
 Maurits De Schrijver (b. 1951), Belgian footballer 
 Jean De Schryver (b. 1916), Belgian boxer

Dutch-language surnames
Occupational surnames